This is a list of films which have placed number one at the weekend box office in Romania during 2017.

Highest-grossing films

The Fate of the Furious and Jumanji: Welcome to the Jungle are the 5th & 6th film respectively to surpass the 10 million lei mark.

See also 

 List of highest-grossing films in Romania
 List of Romanian films

References 

2017
2017 in Romanian cinema
Romania